Dhubri (Pron: ˈdhubri)  is an old town and headquarter of Dhubri district in Indian state of Assam. It is an old town on the bank of the Brahmaputra river, with historical significance. In 1883, the town was first constituted as a Municipal Board under the British regime.

The town is also an important commercial centre and had a busy river port particularly for jute. Dhubri is called the "Land of Rivers" as it is covered three sides by Brahmaputra and Gadadhar rivers.

History 

The word 'Dhuburi' comes from a legendary lady named Netai-Dhubuni. Legends say that Netai-Dhubuni was a laundress who used to wash clothes of the Gods and Goddesses in a small ghat in Dhubri. The story is connected with Behula-Lakhindar. Lakhinar was the son of Chand Sadagar and Behula was Lakhindar's spouse. The word Dhubri is believed to have originated from the word 'Dhubuni' (a lady who washes clothes). According to Bodo-Kacharis, the word is of Bodo origin and derived from Dubri, a kind of grass. The story of lady Netai-Dhubuni is widely accepted for the naming history of Dhubri. Adjacent to this Netai-Dhubuni ghat, there is the Gurdwara Sri Tegh Bahadur Sahib stands.

This place is famous for the Sikh Gurdwara Gurdwara Damdama Sahib or Thara Sahib which was constructed in memory of visit of First Sikh Guru Nanak and later it was followed by visit of Ninth guru, Guru Tegh Bahadur and the Gurdwara is named as Gurdwara Sri Guru Tegh Bahadur Sahib. Hence, it has great importance for Sikh community.

Until 1874, Dhubri was mostly a part of Koch Rajbongshi kings. In 1874, the British Government created a new province named Assam Valley Province and incorporated Goalpara district area comprising three civil subdivisions Dhubri, Goalpara and Kokrajhar with the new Assam Province. In 1879, the district headquarters was shifted from Goalpara to Dhubri city. The district of Dhubri is again subdivided in three districts namely Dhubri, Goalpara and Kokrajhar. The City of Dhubri falls under the jurisdiction of the district of Dhubri whose headquarters is at city Dhubri.

The present Dhubri District is one of the three Civil Sub-divisions of erst-while Goalpara district, established in 1876 during British regime. In 1879 the District headquarters was shifted from Goalpara to Dhubri.

In the year 1983 Goalpara district was divided into four separate districts and Dhubri is one of those. Covering an area of 2,838 km2. including forests, riverines, hills etc. the district has become the most densely populated district in India with a density of 584 persons per km2.(As per 2001 census).

Dhubri District has been visited by many historical personalities like Guru Nanaka, Srimanta Sankardeva, Guru Teg Bahadur, Swami Vivekananda, Mahatma Gandhi, Netaji Subhas Chandra Bose, Gopinath Bordoloi and others.

Dhubri town also was very famous for the Match Factory (WIMCO), though it has shut down due to circumstances but still people who had witnessed the same still remembering the beauty of the factory its staff quarters and their modern art of living.

Dhubri is also famous for its Durga Puja and Dashera.

The Dhubri city was first constituted as a Municipality in 1883. The Dhubri city is 290 km far from the State Capital at Dispur.

Demographics 

 India census, Dhubri had a population 63,388 and Dhubri - Gauripur Metropolitan area had a Population 122400. Males constitute 51% of the population and females 49%. Dhubri has an average literacy rate of 74%, higher than the national average of 59.5%: male literacy is 79% and, female literacy is 68%. In Dhubri, 11% of the population is under 6 years of age. With close to 75% of its population Muslims, it is one of the minority concentrated districts of India.

Most of these people are Bengali Hindus and Muslims, Koch-Rajbongshi and (Goalpariya people) people. Assamese, Goalpariya and Bengali are the major languages spoken in the town.

Geography and climate 
Dhubri is covered by rivers on three sides, predominated by the mighty Brahmaputra River, which is a sorrow as well as joy for the dwellers.

As is typical for Assam and Tripura, Dhubri has a monsoon-influenced humid subtropical climate (Köppen Cwa), being a little too cool to qualify as a tropical monsoon climate. The "cool" or winter season from November to February is warm to very warm during the afternoon, and pleasantly cool in the morning. The "hot" season of March and April is indeed hot and sees increasing humidity and rain, leading into the oppressively humid and extremely wet monsoon season from May to the middle of October.

Educational institutes

College 

 Bholanath College or B. N. College (Established in 1946) is the oldest college in western Assam.
 Dhubri Law College
 Dhubri Girls' College
 Dhubri B. Ed College
 Dhubri Medical College And Hospital
 Pramathesh Barua College, Gauripur
 Chilarai College
 Ajmal College of Arts & Science
 Greenfield Degree College
 Dhubri College of Arts & Science
 ITI Gauripur
 Jamia Millia Islamia University Open & Distance Learning Centre
 Greenfield Junior College Dhubri
 Royal Public Junior College
 Moriom Girls Junior College
 Birat Nagar Junior college
 Vidhya Sagar Academy
 Heritage Science & Arts Academy
 Pratima Barua Science Academy
 Hamidabad College
 Dharmasala College

School 
 Bidyapara Boys Higher Secondary School
 Government Boys Higher Secondary School
 Sishu Pathsala Higher Secondary School
 Government Girls Higher Secondary School
 P.C. Institution, Gauripur
 Hadurhat Dharmashala Higher Secondary School
 H.N Senimari H.S School
 Vivekananda Vidyapith
 Dhubri Municipal High School
 Jawahar Hindi High School
 Sankardev Shishu Bidya Niketan, Dhubri
 Bidyapara Girls High School
 S.P. English Medium High School
 Happy Convent School
 St. Agastya School
 Bethel Baptist Mission School
 Paradise Convent School
 128 no. Bidyapara LP School
 Jamadarhat Janata Higher Secondary School
 Sankar-Azan Adarsha Bidyalaya, Dhubri
 Rasaraj Jatiya Vidlaya
 Dhubri Jatiya Vidlaya
 Brahmaputra Jatiya Vidyalaya
 Dhep Dhepi Higher Secondary School
 Kismat Hasdaha High School
 Jagomahan Vidyapith
 M.U. High Madrassa, Gauripur
Gayan Peeth Jatiya Vidhyalaya

Culture & festivals 

More than 50,000 Hindus, Sikhs, and Muslims assemble in this historic shrine every year in the month of December to mark the martyrdom of Guru Tegh Bahadur, which starts on 3 December with great solemnity and ceremony. Sikhs call the week long reverence of Sahidee-Guru-Parav which is marked with a massive procession. Guru Tegh Bahadur thus earned the affectionate title of "Hind-di-Chadar" or the Shield of Hind dates back to Hindustan.

Transportation

Airport 
Rupsi Airport at Kokrajhar district is the nearest airport which is about 15 km from the main city and 5 km away from Gauripur. It was constructed during World War II by the British mainly for military purpose to accommodate 52 jet airplanes. Until 1983, the Indian Airlines and some private commercial flights operated regularly between Calcutta, Guwahati and Dhubri. The airport started its commercial service after 38 years in 2021, and the airport is operational with connectivity to Kolkata and state capital Guwahati. Flybig operates flights by ATR aircraft under RCS UDAN.

Railway
Dhubri railway station serves the town of Dhubri. The station lies on New Cooch Behar-Golokganj branch line and Fakiragram–Dhubri branch line of Northeast Frontier Railway, Alipurduar railway division.

Sengajan multimodal waterways terminal 
Dhubri multimodal waterways terminal on Brahmaputra in Dhubri is being developed as part of Bharatmala and Sagarmala projects. The city had a very busy river port on the bank of the Brahmaputra which was used as an international trade centre with the neighbouring countries, specially during the British Raj.

Railway 
The importance of the railway station and the MG line was also decreased since 1947, when the direct line to Calcutta was snapped as it ran through erstwhile East Pakistan (now Bangladesh). The train service has newly started on 2010 again, and it is functioning smoothly. However the train services running from the Dhubri railway station are taking a new route from Dhubri to Kamakhya and Guwahati Junction. Trains originating from Dhubri station are, Dhubri – Silghat (Rajya Rani Express), Dhubri – Siliguri (Inter City Express) Dhubri Fakiragram passenger and New Bongaigaon Siliguri Jn Demu Special Via Dhubri

Tourism 
Dhubri District is bestowed with attractive scenic beauties. Both the banks of river Brahmaputra with its lush green fields, blue hills and hillock is a feast to the eyes of the onlookers. The Gurdwara Tegh Bahadur Shaibji, the Rangamati Mosque, Mahamaya Dham, Chakrasila wildlife sanctuary, Matiabagh Hawa Mahal, Satrashal Dham, Panch Peer Dargaha, and other royal palaces attract the people for their unique structures, religious sanctity and mythological importance.

Places of interest 
 Mahamaya Dham and shakti pith Snan Ghat:- of Bogribari, about 30–35 km east from Dhubri town is next to Kamakhya (Guwahati) and Madan-Mohan (Cooch Behar) in its attraction to the pilgrims and tourists. Originally the famous mother Goddess Mahamaya of Parvatjowar was worshipped by the local people like Kacharies, Koches and Naths. It was the presiding deity of the Jaminder of Parvatjowar. Nowadays the mother Mahamaya is worshipped by all Hindus.
 Gurdwara Sri Guru Tegbahadur Sahibji: In the heart of the Dhubri Town and on the bank of the river mighty Brahmaputra, this famous Gurdwara is situated. Sikh Guru Nanak visited this place in 1505 AD and met Sri Sankardeva during Guru Nanak Devji's way from Dhaka to Assam. Thereafter the Ninth Sikh Guru Teg Bahadur came to this place in the year 1666 and established the Gurdwara during 17th century accompany of Raja Ram Singh. Sikh devotees from all over India and abroad assembled in this Gurdwara every year in the month of December to mark the Martydom of Sri Guru Teg Bahadur with due solemnity and ceremony. Sikh devotees called reverence of Sahidee-Guru-Parav.
 Panchpeer Dargaha: It is a Mazar Sharif of five Sufi Saints who accompanied Raja Ram Singh during his time of Mughal conflict with the Ahom Regime of Assam. Guru Tegh Bahadur had also accompanied the Sufi Saints.
 Rangamati Mosque: Rangamati Mosque or Panbari Mosque was built during 17th century by Hussain Shah, the Governor of Bengal (belonging to the pre-Mughal period which can be recognised from its typical architectural design). It is located in Panbari vicinity which is around 25km from township of Dhubri. Rangamati area was once very prosperous during the reign of the Koch rulers as a frontier post. During the Mughal era Rangamati was a great fort of the Mughal Army. This unique Mosque was used as a prayer place by the Muslim Soldiers. There is also an Idgah and a deep well which were also constructed during the same period. Believers from all religious background visit this mosque and often throw coins in the well.
 Other significant features: Two world-famous wetlands – Dheer Beel and Diplai Beel adjoin Chakrasila wildlife Sanctuary. These two Beels are home to a large number of fishes, turtles, prawn and birds both indigenous and migratory.
 Chakrasila Wildlife Sanctuary: In 1994 Chakrasila Hill Reserve Forest was declared as Chakrasila Hill Wildlife Sanctuary by the government of India covering 4558.7 hectares of land. The distribution of varieties of plant species in Chakrasila provides diverse niches for many species of wildlife. The significant golden langur exists in Chakrasila Wildlife Sanctuary in addition to other mammals like leopard, leopard cat, porcupine, pangolin, flying squirrel and civet cat. adjutant stork, Indian owl, myna, parakeet, dove, hornbill, jungle fowl, kingfisher, heron, darter, snipe and teal are the birds commonly found. Python, monitor, crait, cobra, turtle, tead and frog are some reptiles and amphibia that are also found. It is in the Kokrajhar district and about 5 km from Kokrajhar town and 70;km from Dhubri Town. This sanctuary provides facilities / activities such as bird watching, forest trekking, wildlife and nature photography. Local guides are available on payment. There is a site for erecting tents and free accommodation for a group of 15 individuals with hygienic drinking water in the camp Tapoban provided by the local NGOs.
 Florican Garden: A newly setup garden-cum-natural park located at Bilasipara about 50 km from Dhubri Town.
 Pagalathan Temple: A Shiva temple along with some others temples and Chandardinga Hill, the hill said to have originated on the sank Ship of Chand Saudagar (Chand Trader from Behula-Lakhindar) in Salkocha near the Brahmaputra River located about 60 kms from Dhubri. This place is best to spent some moment in peace which enjoying the view of Brahmaputra on one side and Chandardinga hill on other at Mahadevs foot.
 Others: Other tourist places include Matiabag Palace at Gauripur, Netai Dhubuni Ghat at Dhubri Town, Chandardinga Hillock, Dudhnath Mondir at Salkocha, Ramraikuti at Satrasal, Airport of IInd World War and Soreswar beel at Rupshi ok Kokrajhar district, Dhubri matches factory.

Malls
 Reliance Digital
 Vishal Mega Mart
 Metro Bazaar
 V-Mart 
 Bazaar Kolkata
 Cosmo Bazaar
 Bazar India
 Mihir Shopping Mart
 K Lounge

Cinemas
 Bishnu Takies
 Basanta Cinema (Now Closed)
 Rupali Takies (Permanently Closed)

Parks
 Netai Dhubuni Park
 Rajiv Gandhi Children Park
 Victoria Memorial Park

Hotels
 Swagat Hotel 
 Hotel Vijaya Residency
 Hotel Bramaputra
 Samrat Hotel
 The Town Hotel
 Hotel Rainbow
 Tripti Hotel
 Hotel Mount View
 Bramaputra Guest House
 Prasanti Tourist Lodge
 Hotel Galaxy
 Jamuna Hotel
 Mahamaya Hotel
 Happy Lodge
 Nehar Lodge
 Rose Lodge
 Abha Lodge

Industry
 Assam Match Company Limited
 Kissan Oil Company
 Mangaldeep Agarbatti 
 Royal Tea Company

Flora and fauna 
On 14 July 1994, a virgin little forest patch of Dhubri District but mostly that is 95% in Kokrajhar district of Assam was declared as a wildlife sanctuary by the gazette notification of the Assam Government. This sanctuary has been named as "Chakrashila Wildlife Sanctuary". Chakrasila is unique because of the presence of golden langur (Presbytis geei) which is found nowhere else except along the Assam and Bhutan border. Besides, the virgin forest of Chakrasila Wildlife Sanctuary is endowed with rare specimens of trees, shrubs, medicinal plants, mammals, reptiles and exquisite birds and insects.

Geographical location of the Chakrasila Wildlife Sanctuary is in the latitude 26° 15' to 26° 26' N and longitude 90° 15' to 90 ° 20' E. It is in the District of Dhubri that is only 5% but mostly that is 95% in Kokrajhar district, the westernmost region of Assam. It is 68 km from the District headquarters Dhubri and 219 km from the Borjhar Airport of Guwahati City.

There are several small springs for quenching the thirst of the wild animals of this hilly forest. But the two major perennial springs in the sanctuary are howhowi Jhora and Bamuni Jhora, which flow over the rocks, sparkling and spattering throughout the year, adding to the scenic beauty of the sanctuary.

Climatic conditions of Chakrasila Wildlife Sanctuary is like that of temperate zone with dry winter and hot summer followed by heavy rains. Annual rainfall is between 200 and 400 cm. Soil is azonal, forestlike and hilly. temperature throughout the year generally varies between 8 °C to 30 °C.

The diverse ecosystems of Chakrasila present a model habitat diversity and support various mammalian species like tiger, leopard, golden langur, leopard cat, gaur, mongoose, porcupine, pangolin, flying squirrel, civet cat, etc. Along with all these prolific gifts of the nature Chakrasila has a wide variety of avifauna.

The two internationally recognized wetlands namely Dhir and Deeplai has not been yet taken inside the declared boundary of the sanctuary. But they are very a part of the Chakrasila eco-system. It is expected that in due course they will be included within the sanctuary.
Courtesy : Nature's Beckon ( An Environmental Activist of North-East )

Politics 
Dhubri is part of Dhubri (Lok Sabha constituency).

Media 
Dhubri has an All India Radio Relay station known as Akashvani Dhubri. It broadcasts on FM frequencies.

Notable people 
 Pramathesh Barua, Bollywood filmmaker
 Jamuna Barua, Bollywood actress
 Padma Shri Pratima Barua Pandey, singer
 Vijay Saxena, Bollywood actor
 Priyadarshini Chatterjee, Femina Miss India World in 2016
 B. C. Sanyal, painter, sculptor, Art teacher
 Sarat Chandra Sinha, fifth Chief Minister of Assam, social activist.
 Rebati Mohan Dutta Choudhury, noted Bengali, Assamese litterateur.
 Tapas Sen, Theatre Artist
 Saifuddin Ahmed, Winner Of Bangladesh National Film Award for Best Supporting Actor
 Javed Zaman, Indian first-class cricketer

See also 
 Dhubri (Lok Sabha constituency)
 Dhubri railway station
 Rupsi Airport, Dhubri

References

External links 

 Dhubri District Official Website
 Glorious India Website

 
Cities and towns in Dhubri district